Terje Isungset (born May 4, 1964) is a Norwegian drummer. From his background in jazz and traditional Scandinavian music, he has designed musical instruments from non-traditional materials, including ice.

Career 

Isungset was raised in Geilo where he played traditional dance music with his father (accordion) during his high school days. Moving to Bergen in 1984 led him to be a popular member of a number of Bergen groups, such as Ictus and Tordenskjolds soldater (1984–85), Growl and Gruv (1984-88), Saksbehandlerne and Night and Day (1985–86), Salsa Pati (1985–87), and Supply (1985–88), in addition to periods within the Big Band Emanon from 1986, and his recording debut Amalgamation (1985) with Kenneth Sivertsen.

Isungset is, after more than two decades on the jazz scene, one of Europe's most accomplished and innovative percussionists. With more than 25 years experience in jazz and Scandinavian traditional music he raises these narrow forms of music far beyond their traditional boundaries, becoming more like a crossover between a sound artist and a shaman. When crafting his own instruments from Norwegian natural elements such as arctic birch, granite, slate, sheep bells and even ice, he is highly recommended to those sensible to the poetry and simplicity of sounds.

His work is highly acclaimed in the press, often described as innovative, visual, energetic, and different from any previously known concepts. His love for ice music was raised in 1999 when the commission of the winterfestival at Lillehammer asked him to compose and play in a frozen waterfall.  He has invented the concept of icemusic, and also invented a way to perform icemusic indoor in ordinary concert halls, doing around 50 indoor ice concerts every year.  CNN calls Isungset the first and only icemusician in the world.

Isungset has been commissioned to compose music for jazz festivals, dance performances, theatre, and film, with 41 commissioned concerts.

He has released ten solo albums and is now doing most of his work internationally. Solo concerts, with his band or in collaboration with other artists. In 2006 he had the idea of creating an icemusic festival and started the Ice Music Festival at Geilo, Norway organized by Pål Knutsson Medhus. He is also the founding manager of the record label All Ice Records.

His most recent project is the Glassmusic together with Arve Henriksen. They released an album named World of Glass in late 2014. The recordings were largely made in front of a live audience in Tallinn. All the instruments were made from glass by students from the Estonian Academy of Arts.

He is a member of the bandsGroupa (Sweden), Utla and Isglem. He has ongoing duos with Per Jørgensen, Arve Henriksen, Sissel Vera Pettersen, Didier Petit, Therese Skauge, Jorma Tapio and Stian Westerhus.

For the 2017 Vossajazz festival, Isungset was commissioned to compose new music for a new band.

Isungset is also an associate professor at the Grieg Academy, University of Bergen.

Honors 
 1996: Vossajazzprisen
 2016:Financial Times named Isungset as one of the "First persons". 
 2008: Edvardprisen in the Open class for the album Igloo

Projects 
2010: Organic expressions, project with three dancers (Rebecca Hytting, Guro Rimeslåtten, Christine Kjellberg) from the Carte Blanche Dance Company
2012: Isslottet, at the Oslo Opera and Ballet

Discography

Solo albums 
1997: Reise (NorCD)
2000: Floating Rhythms (Via Music)
2002: Iceman Is (All Ice Records) (Jazzland/Virgin), with Arve Henriksen
2003: Middle of Mist (NorCD)
2006: Igloo (All Ice Records), nominated for Spellemannprisen in the class Jazz, with Sidsel Endresen
2007: Two Moons (All Ice Records), with Per Jørgensen
2008: Ice Concerts (All Ice Records)
2009: Hibernation (All Ice Records)
2010: Winter Songs (All Ice Records)
2014: World Of Glass (All Ice Records), with Arve Henriksen
2015: Meditations (All Ice Records)
2015: Terje Isungset & Stian Westerhus (All Ice Records), with Stian Westerhus
2015: Isslottet (All Ice Records)
2016: Oase Terje Isungset & Sissel Vera Pettersen (All Ice Records)
2019: Sildrande (All Ice Records) Terje Isungset with Arve Henriksen, Mats Eilertsen, Nils Økland, Morten Qvenild, Sissel Vera Pettersen & others

Collaborative works 
With Kenneth Sivertsen
1985: Amalgamation (Hot Club Records), including Knut Riisnæs and Bjørn Kjellemyr

Within Karl Seglem's Sogn-A-Song
1991: Sogn-A-Song (NorCD)
1994: Rit (NorCD)

Within Isglem (duo with Karl Seglem)
1991: Rom (NorCD)
1992: To Steg (NorCD)
1996: Null G (NorCD)
2003: Fire (NorCD)
2016: "Femte" (NorCD)

Within Orleysa, fest. Tore Brunborg
1991: Orleysa (Odin Records)
1993: Svanshornet (Odin Records)

Within Utla (including Håkon Høgemo and Karl Seglem)
1992: Utla (NorCD)
1993: Juv (NorCD)
1995: Brodd (NorCD)
1999: Dans (NorCD)
2003: Song (NorCD), feat. Berit Opheim Versto

Within Groupa (including Jonas Simonson and Mats Edén)
1999: Lavalek (Xource)
2008: Frost (Footprint)
2014: Silent Folk (Footprint)
2016: "Kind of folk,vol1. Sweden. (All Ice Records)

With others
1995: Haugtussa (Kirkelig Kulturverksted), with poems by Arne Garborg (including Lynni Treekrem, Annbjørg Lien, Arild Andersen, Børge Petersen-Øverleir, Hans Fredrik Jacobsen, Ketil Bjørnstad, Per Hillestad and Tone Hulbækmo) 
1995: Det syng (Kirkelig Kulturverksted), with Lynni Treekrem 
1996: Prosa (NorCD), with poems by Jon Fosse (including Arve Henriksen, Håkon Høgemo, Karl Seglem and Reidar Skår)
1996: Tya - frå Bor til Bytes (NorCD), with Elin Rosseland, Karl Seglem and Reidar Skår
1998: Spir (NorCD), with Karl Seglem, Berit Opheim Versto, Morten Sæle and Audun Erlien
1999: Bergtatt, with Grete Helgerød and Oslo Kammerkor
2000: Daa (NorCD), trio with Arve Henriksen and Karl Seglem
2001: Shadows And Light (FMR Records), duo with Frode Gjerstad
2004: New North (NorCD), with Karl Seglem
2005: Didier Petit - Terje Isungset (Vossa Jazz Records), duo with Didier Petit live at Vossajazz 2003
2006: Aihki (Ektro Records), duo with Jorma Tapio
2006: Sáivu, with Arve Henriksen and Torgeir Vassvik
2006: On the Great Alkali Plains (Jester Records), with Espen Jørgensen
2008: Agbalagba Daada (Ektro Records), duo with Per Jørgensen
2008: Laden With Rain (FMR Records), duo with Stian Westerhus
2008: Sådagen (Etnisk musikklubb), with Eilif Gundersen, Gunnlaug Lien Myhr and Tor Egil Kreken
2011: City Stories (NorCD), with Daniel Herskedal
2011: Beginner's Guide to Scandinavia (Nascente/Virgin), with various artists

References

External links

Ice Music website
All Ice Records website
Norwegian Ice Festival website
www.glassmusic.no
www.groupa.se
Foxy Digitalis interview, 2006

1964 births
Living people
Norwegian composers
Norwegian male composers
20th-century Norwegian drummers
21st-century Norwegian drummers
Norwegian jazz drummers
Male drummers
Norwegian percussionists
Musicians from Hol
Musicians from Bergen
Norwegian musical instrument makers
NorCD artists
20th-century drummers
20th-century Norwegian male musicians
21st-century Norwegian male musicians
Male jazz musicians
Trondheim Jazz Orchestra members
Geir Lysne Listening Ensemble members
Agbaland members
Jazzland Recordings (1997) artists
FMR Records artists